Cymatophora is a genus of moths in the family Geometridae erected by Jacob Hübner in 1812. It is monotypic, being represented by the single species, the giant gray moth (Cymatophora approximaria). It is found mostly in the south-eastern United States. It is found in North America.

The MONA or Hodges number for Cymatophora approximaria is 6745.

References

Further reading

 
 
 
 
 
 
 
 
 

Angeronini
Articles created by Qbugbot
Moths described in 1812
Monotypic moth genera